Ea Pôk is a township of Cư M'gar District, Đắk Lắk Province, Vietnam.

References

Populated places in Đắk Lắk province
Townships in Vietnam